Hilarographa rampayoha is a species of moth of the family Tortricidae. It is found in Brunei.

The wingspan is about 14 mm. The ground colour of the forewings is cream, partly suffused with ochreous consisting of two postbasal fasciae and a submedian fascia divided by olive brownish lines which are concolorous with the basal and costo-posterior areas. The hindwings are olive brownish,  but cream at the base.

Etymology
The name refers to the type locality.

References

Moths described in 2009
Hilarographini